Melfort, Zimbabwe is a village in Mashonaland Central province in Zimbabwe.

Populated places in Mashonaland Central Province